Muhammad bin Sabah Al-Sabah also known as Noor Al Sabah, (1838 – 17 May 1896) was the sixth ruler of the Sheikhdom of Kuwait between May 1892 and May 1896 during which he held the title of Pasha from the Ottoman Sultan. He was the second son of Sabah II Al-Sabah and succeeded his half-brother Abdullah II Al-Sabah upon his death in 1892. 

When Muhammad came to power, disagreements soon arose between him and his brother Mubarak. Muhammad dealt with this by occupying Mubarak with foreign affairs, dispatching him to Hasa with an Ottoman force, and to the desert in order to settle affairs amongst tribes without providing funding.

In 1896, Mubarak summoned his sons Jaber and Salim, and some supporters, and rode to Kuwait where they secretly entered Muhammad's house. Muhammad and his brother Jarrah were assassinated in his house by Mubarak Al-Sabah on 17 May 1896. 

Following the assassination Mubarak became the ruler of Kuwait and the sons of Muhammad and Jarrah exiled to al Zubayr and stayed there until 1921.

References

19th-century monarchs in the Middle East
19th-century murdered monarchs
1845 births
1896 deaths
House of Al-Sabah
Rulers of Kuwait
People murdered in Kuwait
History of Kuwait